The Great Gatsby is a 1999 opera in two acts written by American composer John Harbison. The libretto, also by Harbison, was adapted from the 1925 novel The Great Gatsby by F. Scott Fitzgerald. Additional popular song lyrics were by Murray Horwitz. The opera was commissioned by the Metropolitan Opera in honor of music director James Levine's 25th anniversary with the company.

Performance history
The Great Gatsby had its premiere performance on December 20, 1999. Conducted by Levine, the cast included Jerry Hadley, Dawn Upshaw and Lorraine Hunt Lieberson. The stage production was by Mark Lamos. The opera has been performed at the Met twelve times in two seasons. In 2000 it was produced at Lyric Opera of Chicago. The opera has received mixed reviews, some describing it as "undramatic and dull."  It was also performed in the summer of 2012 at the Aspen Music Festival and School. It was performed at Seagle Festival in Schroon Lake, NY in the summer of 2018.

The first European performance was on 6 December 2015 at the Semperoper in Dresden conducted by Wayne Marshall.

Roles

References

The Metropolitan Opera Database.
Opera publisher G. Schirmer, Inc.

External links
An interview with John Harbison
David Stevens, "Harbison Mixes Up A Great 'Gatsby'" (Review of the premiere), International Herald Tribune, December 29, 1999
Metropolitan Opera, Synopsis: The Great Gatsby

Operas by John Harbison
Adultery in theatre
Operas
Operas set in the United States
English-language operas
Opera world premieres at the Metropolitan Opera
1999 operas
Operas based on novels
Works based on The Great Gatsby